The Rural Municipality of Lawtonia No. 135 is a rural municipality (RM) in the Canadian province of Saskatchewan within Census Division No. 7 and  Division No. 3.

History 
The RM of Lawtonia No. 135 incorporated as a rural municipality on December 12, 1910.

Geography

Communities and localities 
The following urban municipalities are surrounded by the RM.

Villages
Hodgeville

The following unincorporated communities are within the RM.

Localities
Flowing Well
Tyson
Vogel

Demographics 

Government 
The RM of Lawtonia No. 135 is governed by an elected municipal council and an appointed administrator that meets on the second Wednesday of every month. The reeve of the RM is Andrew Hanson while its administrator is Raelee Boehm. The RM's office is located in Hodgeville.

Transportation 
Highway 19—serves Hodgeville, Saskatchewan
Highway 363—serves Hodgeville, Saskatchewan

See also 
List of rural municipalities in Saskatchewan

References 

Lawtonia